A prefix is an affix which is placed before the stem of a word. Adding it to the beginning of one word changes it into another word. For example, when the prefix un- is added to the word happy, it creates the word unhappy. Particularly in the study of languages, a prefix is also called a preformative, because it alters the form of the words to which it is affixed.

Prefixes, like other affixes, can be either inflectional, creating a new form of the word with the same basic meaning and same lexical category (but playing a different role in the sentence), or derivational, creating a new word with a new semantic meaning and sometimes also a different lexical category. Prefixes, like all other affixes, are usually bound morphemes.

In English, there are no inflectional prefixes; English uses suffixes instead for that purpose.

The word prefix is itself made up of the stem fix (meaning "attach", in this case), and the prefix pre- (meaning "before"), both of which are derived from Latin roots.

English language

List of English derivational prefixes

This is a fairly comprehensive, although not exhaustive, list of derivational prefixes in English. Depending on precisely how one defines a derivational prefix, some of the neoclassical combining forms may or may not qualify for inclusion in such a list. This list takes the broad view that acro- and auto- count as English derivational prefixes because they function the same way that prefixes such as over- and self- do.

As for numeral prefixes, only the most common members of that class are included here. There is a large separate table covering them all at Numeral prefix > Table of number prefixes in English.

Hyphenation
The choice between hyphenation or solid styling for prefixes in English is covered at Hyphen > Prefixes and suffixes.

Japanese language
They are used as part of the honorific system of speech, and are used as markers for politeness, showing respect for the person or thing they are affixed to, notably also being used euphemistically.

Bantu languages
In the Bantu languages of Africa, which are agglutinating, the noun class is conveyed through prefixes, which is declined and agrees with all of its arguments accordingly.

Example from Luganda

Navajo
Verbs in the Navajo language are formed from a word stem and multiple affixes.  For example, each verb requires one of four non-syllabic prefixes (∅, ł, d, l) to create a verb theme.

Sunwar
In the Sunwar language of Eastern Nepal, the prefix ma- म is used to create negative verbs.  It is the only verbal prefix in the language.

Russian
As a part of the formation of nouns, prefixes are less common in Russian than suffixes, but alter the meaning of a word.

{|
|-
|пред- and положение 'position' becomes предположение 'supposition'
|-
| пре- and образование 'formation (verb)' becomes преобразование 'transformation' 
|}

German
In German, derivatives formed with prefixes may be classified in two categories: those used with substantives and adjectives, and those used with verbs. For derivative substantives and adjectives, only two productive prefixes are generally addable to any substantive or adjective as of 1970: un-, which expresses negation (as in ungesund, from gesund), and ur-, which means "original, primitive" in substantives, and has an emphatic function in adjectives. ge-, on the other hand, expresses union or togetherness, but only in a closed group of words—it cannot simply be added to any noun or adjective.

Verbal prefixes commonly in use are be-, ent-, er-, ge-, miss-, ver-, and zer- (see also Separable verb). be- expresses strengthening or generalization. ent- expresses negation. ge- indicates the completion of an action, which is why its most common use has become the forming of the past participle of verbs; ver- has an emphatic function, or it is used to turn a substantive or an adjective into a verb. In some cases, the prefix particle ent- (negation) can be considered the opposite of particle be-, while er- can be considered the opposite of ver-.

The prefix er- usually indicates the successful completion of an action, and sometimes the conclusion means death. With fewer verbs, it indicates the beginning of an action. The prefix er- is also used to form verbs from adjectives (e.g. erkalten is equivalent to kalt werden which means "to get cold").

See also 
Affix
Suffix
Privative
Bound and unbound morphemes
English prefix
List of Greek and Latin roots in English
substring#Prefix
Metric prefix

References

Works cited
 

 
Affixes
Lexical units
Linguistics terminology